Andy Mikita is a Canadian television director and producer. He has worked in the TV and film industry for over 30 years.  Mikita is best known for his work as a director and producer for Stargate SG-1, and its sister shows Stargate Atlantis and Stargate Universe.

Career
Andy Mikita began his television career on the 1987 series 21 Jump Street where he worked as a second assistant director. He worked on many other television series from 1989 to 1996, until he joined Stargate SG-1'''s crew as a first assistant director in 1997 and in 1999 he made his directing debut on the episode "Foothold".

Mikita made his acting debut as brief cameo on Stargate SG-1 in the episode "Wormhole X-Treme!", he appeared again as a wedding guest in the episode "200".

In early 2009, Mikita was slated to direct a direct-to-DVD Stargate Atlantis movie with the working title of Stargate: Extinction. The production was shelved later in 2009.

Selected filmography
DirectorStargate SG-1 (1999–2007, 29 episodes)Stargate Atlantis (2004–2009, 22 episodes)Blood Ties (2007, 3 episodes)Stargate Universe (2009–2011, 12 episodes)Primeval: New World (2012–2013, 4 episodes)Transporter: The Series (2012, 3 episodes)Lost Girl (2013, 2 episodes)Motive (2013–2016, 12 episodes)The Dark Corner (2013, 8 episodes, miniseries)Mr. Hockey: The Gordie Howe Story (2013, TV movie)Cedar Cove (2013–2015, 5 episodes)Played (2013, 1 episode)Bitten (2014, 2 episodes)Strange Empire (2014, 2 episodes)Reign (2015–2017, 3 episodes)Killjoys (2015–2017, 2 episodes)Olympus (2015, 2 episodes)Dark Matter (2015–2016, 3 episodes)X Company (2016, 2 episodes)Travelers (2016–2018, 11 episodes)Chesapeake Shores (2017, 2 episodes)Good Witch (2018, 2 episodes)Blindspot (2018, 1 episode)Unspeakable (2019, 2 episodes, miniseries)The Murders (2019, 2 episodes)Mystery 101: Words Can Kill (2019, TV movie)Virgin River (2019, 4 episodes)Family Law (2021, 2 episodes)

ProducerStargate SG-1 (2002–2007, series producer / co-producer for seasons 6–10)Stargate Atlantis (2007–2009, series producer for seasons 4–5)Stargate Universe (2009–2010, series co-producer for season 1)Transporter: The Series (2012, consulting producer - 6 episodes)Family Law'' (2021, series executive producer)

References

External links

Andy Mikita at Stargate Official Site
Andy Mikita on StargateWiki

Living people
Canadian television directors
Year of birth missing (living people)
Canadian television producers